Mangit may refer to:

 Manghud, a clan of the Mongols and later a nomadic group of the Uzbeks
 Mangit, Kyrgyzstan
 Mangit, Uzbekistan